The white-eared conebill (Conirostrum leucogenys) is a species of bird in the family Thraupidae.

It is found in Colombia, Panama, and Venezuela. Its natural habitats are subtropical or tropical moist lowland forests and heavily degraded former forest.

References

white-eared conebill
Birds of Panama
Birds of Colombia
Birds of Venezuela
white-eared conebill
Taxonomy articles created by Polbot